O. Henry Hall, formerly known as the U.S. Post Office and Federal Building, is a historic courthouse and post office in Austin, Texas. It is located within the Sixth Street Historic District in Downtown Austin. O. Henry Hall serves as the administrative headquarters of the Texas State University System (TSUS), and until 2017 served as the University of Texas System headquarters.

History

Architect James G. Hill designed the building, and it was constructed partially under the supervision of architect Abner Cook. The courthouse was completed in 1879 at a cost of $200,000.

The United States District Court for the Western District of Texas met there from then until 1936. One of its most noted trials occurred in February 1898, when William Sidney Porter - the man who later became known under the pen name of O. Henry - was tried and convicted of embezzlement.

It was acquired by the University of Texas System in 1968 and renamed for the author, who had previously resided nearby in what is now officially called the William Sidney Porter House, but is better known as the O. Henry House. The building was listed on the National Register of Historic Places on August 25, 1970. It previously served as the administrative headquarters of that system.

TSUS purchased O. Henry Hall in 2015 for $8.2 million. The UT System leased it and continued using it as its administrative headquarters prior to the 2017 completion of the UT System's current headquarters. TSUS did the move so it could have a single administrative office in Downtown; it formerly occupied three different downtown buildings operated by the state government.

See also
List of United States federal courthouses in Texas

References

External links

Federal Judicial Center page on the United States Court House and Post Office
O.Henry Hall - O'Connell Architecture (company doing architectural restoration for TSUS offices)

Federal buildings in the United States
National Register of Historic Places in Austin, Texas
Renaissance Revival architecture in Texas
Government buildings completed in 1881
Buildings and structures in Austin, Texas
Former federal courthouses in the United States
Post office buildings on the National Register of Historic Places in Texas
Courthouses on the National Register of Historic Places in Texas
O. Henry
1881 establishments in Texas